Sidneys Knob appears to be an atypical mountain for Pennsylvania when viewed from the northeast. Most of the mountains in the Commonwealth are long linear ridges or flatted topped plateau mountains. Sidneys Knob is part of a bifurcated ridgeline as seen in the topographic map below.

The mountain is seen on postcards, mainly viewed from the Pennsylvania Turnpike, as vehicles exit west out of the Tuscarora Mountain Tunnel northeast of the peak. Sometimes referred to as "Pyramid Point" or on early postcards as Henry's Knob, this landmark is one of the most noted on the turnpike.

References

 
 Postcard site including Sidneys Knob or "Henry's Knob"

Mountains of Pennsylvania
Landforms of Fulton County, Pennsylvania